Takenoko may refer to:

 Bamboo shoot
 Takenoko-zoku
 Takenoko (board game)